George Brockwell (14 August 1809 – 12 December 1876) was an English first-class cricketer active 1844–57 who played for Surrey. He was born in Kingston-upon-Thames and died in Hackney. He played in 44 first-class matches.

References

1809 births
1876 deaths
English cricketers
North v South cricketers
Surrey cricketers
Surrey Club cricketers